Hochtaunus is an electoral constituency (German: Wahlkreis) represented in the Bundestag. It elects one member via first-past-the-post voting. Under the current constituency numbering system, it is designated as constituency 176. It is located in southwestern Hesse, comprising most of Hochtaunuskreis and the northeastern part of the Limburg-Weilburg district.

Hochtaunus was created for the inaugural 1949 federal election. Since 2013, it has been represented by Markus Koob of the Christian Democratic Union (CDU).

Geography
Hochtaunus is located in southwestern Hesse. As of the 2021 federal election, it comprises the entirety of the Hochtaunuskreis district excluding the municipalities of Königstein im Taunus, Kronberg im Taunus, and Steinbach (Taunus), as well as the municipalities of Beselich, Löhnberg, Mengerskirchen, Merenberg, Runkel, Villmar, Weilburg, Weilmünster, and Weinbach from the Limburg-Weilburg district.

History
Hochtaunus was created in 1949, then known as Obertaunuskreis. In the 1972 election, it was named Obertaunuskreis (Hochtaunuskreis). It acquired its current name in the 1976 election. In the 1949 election, it was Hesse constituency 10 in the numbering system. From 1953 through 1976, it was number 135. From 1980 through 1998, it was number 133. In the 2002 and 2005 elections, it was number 177. Since the 2009 election, it has been number 176.

Originally, the constituency comprised the districts of Oberlahnkreis, Obertaunuskreis, and Usingen. From 1976 through 1998, it comprised the Hochtaunuskreis district, the municipalities of Beselich, Löhnberg, Mengerskirchen, Merenberg, Runkel, Villmar, Weilburg, Weilmünster, and Weinbach from the Limburg-Weilburg district, and the municipalities of Eppstein and Kelkheim from the Main-Taunus-Kreis district. It acquired its current borders in the 2002 election.

Members
The constituency was represented by six different members in the first six terms of the Bundestag: Heinrich Müller of the Social Democratic Party (SPD) from 1949 to 1953, Erich Köhler of the Christian Democratic Union (CDU) from 1953 to 1957, Berthold Martin of the CDU from 1957 to 1961, Kurt Gscheidle of the SPD from 1961 to 1965, Walther Leisler Kiep of the CDU from 1965 to 1969, and Dietrich Sperling of the SPD from 1969 to 1973. Sperling was re-elected in 1972. Manfred Langner won the constituency for the CDU in 1976 and served until 1990, when he was succeeded by fellow party member Bärbel Sothmann. Holger Haibach served from 2002 to 2013. Markus Koob was elected in 2013, and re-elected in 2017 and 2021.

Election results

2021 election

2017 election

2013 election

2009 election

References

Federal electoral districts in Hesse
1949 establishments in West Germany
Constituencies established in 1949
Hochtaunuskreis
Limburg-Weilburg